The Bangladesh cricket team toured New Zealand in March and April 2021 to play three Twenty20 International (T20I) and three One Day International (ODI) matches. Originally, the tour was scheduled to take place in October 2020, ahead of the then scheduled ICC Men's T20 World Cup. In August 2020, New Zealand Cricket confirmed that the tour was going ahead, and were working with their government to comply with biosecurity during the COVID-19 pandemic. On 29 September 2020, New Zealand Cricket confirmed the schedule against Bangladesh. The ODI matches formed part of the inaugural 2020–2023 ICC Cricket World Cup Super League.

On 4 February 2021, the tour dates were pushed back by one week, to allow for enough preparation and the logistics for quarantine due to the COVID-19 pandemic. The T20I matches were played as double-headers alongside the women's fixtures between New Zealand and Australia.

Ahead of the tour, New Zealand's captain Kane Williamson was ruled out of the ODI matches due to an elbow injury, with Tom Latham named as captain in his place. New Zealand won the first two ODIs, with Latham scoring an unbeaten century in the second match, winning the series with a game to spare. New Zealand won the third and final ODI by 164 runs, to win the series 3–0. New Zealand won the first two T20I matches to win the series with a game to spare. New Zealand won the third T20I by 65 runs, to also win the series 3–0.

Squads

Ross Taylor was ruled out of the first ODI and was replaced by Mark Chapman in New Zealand's squad. Bangladesh's Tamim Iqbal opted out of the T20I matches due to personal reasons. Hasan Mahmud suffered an injury during the first ODI and was ruled out of Bangladesh's T20I squad.

ODI series

1st ODI

2nd ODI

3rd ODI

T20I series

1st T20I

2nd T20I

3rd T20I

Notes

References

External links
 Series home at ESPN Cricinfo

2020 in Bangladeshi cricket
2020 in New Zealand cricket
International cricket competitions in 2020–21
Bangladeshi cricket tours of New Zealand
Cricket events postponed due to the COVID-19 pandemic